Sabaash Meena is a 1958 Indian Tamil-language comedy film produced and directed by B. R. Panthulu. The film stars Sivaji Ganesan, B. Saroja Devi, Chandrababu and Malini, with Panthulu and S. V. Ranga Rao in supporting roles. It was released on 3 October 1958. The film was remade into Hindi as Dil Tera Deewana (1962), in Kannada as Aliya Geleya (1971), and in Malayalam as Chirikkudukka (1976).

Plot 
Mohan is a rich spoilt brat. His erratic and irresponsible behaviour forces his father Sadasivam Pillai to send him to his friend Appadurai's place in Madras to work and learn something in life. Mohan, a street smart man, sends his friend Shekar in his place to Appadurai. Appadurai, who has not seen Mohan before, accepts Shekar as Mohan and gives him a job. Shekar falls in love with Appadurai's daughter and Mohan who meets Meena in a bus falls for her. 

Adding to the mix is Mookan, played by Chandrababu again, who gets swapped with the Sekhar giving hilarious situation while Sankar, the corrupt manager of Appadurai and the intended groom for Meena, serves as villain to unite Sekhar and Mohan to resolve all issues and take their due place.

What follows is a hilarious depiction of both their love stories and the confusions it creates.

Cast 

Male cast
 Sivaji Ganesan as Mohan
 B. R. Panthulu as Meena's father
 Chandrababu as Shekar
 S. V. Ranga Rao as Appadurai
 V. R. Rajagopal as Mani
 D. Balasubramaniam
 M. R. Santhanam
 Natarajan as Sankar
 Ponnusamy Pillai as Sadhasivam Pillai
 Ganapathy Bhat

Female cast
 B. Saroja Devi as Malathi
 Malini as Meena
 P. S. Gnanam as Paravathi
 Krishnabai
 Chandra as a dancer in "Aanaaga Pirandhathellam"
 Shantha

Production 
Chandrababu's pay for the film was one rupee higher than Ganesan's.

Soundtrack 
The music was composed by T. G. Lingappa, with lyrics by Ku. Ma. Balasubramaniam. The song "Kaanaa Inbam Kannidhadheno" is set in the Hindustani raga Bageshri.

Release and reception 
Sabaash Meena was released on 3 October 1958, and was distributed by A. L. S. Productions. It was previously scheduled for 19 September 1958, but got postponed due to delays in the arrival of raw film. The film was a major success, even in non-Tamil speaking regions such as Karnataka. It was dubbed into Telugu as Sabash Pilla, which did not achieve the same success.

Remakes 
Sabhash Meena was remade into Hindi as Dil Tera Deewana (1962) with Panthulu again directing. He also directed the Kannada remake Aliya Geleya (1971). The film was also remade in Malayalam as Chirikkudukka (1976). The 1996 Tamil film Ullathai Allitha was an unofficial remake of Sabash Meena.

References

External links 

1950s Tamil-language films
1958 comedy films
1958 films
Films directed by B. R. Panthulu
Films scored by T. G. Lingappa
Indian comedy films
Tamil films remade in other languages